Andriy Stryzhak may refer to:
 Andriy Stryzhak (judge)
 Andriy Stryzhak (footballer)